Jake Arnold is a British interior designer based in Los Angeles, and co-founder of The Expert.

Career
Arnold has worked with several celebrity clients including Aaron Paul, Rashida Jones, Julianne Hough, Sophia Bush, Katy Perry, Chrissy Teigen and John Legend, as well as entrepreneurs such as Stewart Butterfield, Jen Rubio, and Katherine Power.

Arnold's work has been featured in publications such as Architectural Digest, Forbes, CNN, Vogue (magazine) and Better Homes and Gardens (magazine), as well as on the cover of ELLE Decor. 

In 2019, Arnold was named one of The Hollywood Reporter's Top 20 Interior Designers in Los Angeles.

In 2021, Arnold was named to Architectural Digest's 'AD100' list of top designers for 2022.

The Expert

In February 2021, Arnold's co-founded a company, The Expert, alongside his best friend and serial entrepreneur Leo Seigal, with the launch announced in Architectural Digest.

In April 2021, it was announced that Arnold and The Expert had raised $3 million in seed funding from investors including Kirsten Green's Forerunner Ventures and Gwyneth Paltrow.

In September 2021, Arnold was a speaker at the "Future of Home" conference in New York, where it was revealed that the platform had grown to over 150 'A-list' designers.

References

American interior designers
Living people
Year of birth missing (living people)